Pseudopteris is a genus of flowering plants belonging to the family Sapindaceae.

Its native range is Madagascar.

Species:

Pseudopteris ankaranensis 
Pseudopteris arborea 
Pseudopteris decipiens

References

Sapindaceae
Sapindaceae genera